Bairak may refer to:

 Bairak, Lypova Dolyna Raion, a village in Sumy Oblast, Ukraine
 Mykola Bairak, Ukrainian boxer who fought Alexander Gurov
 Yuliia Bairak, Ukrainian discus thrower at the 2016 IAAF World U20 Championships
 Oksana Bairak, director of the 2006 Ukrainian film Aurora

See also
 Velyki Bairak, a settlement in Myrhorod Raion, Poltava Oblast, Ukraine
 Bayrak (disambiguation)